The China men's national field hockey team represents the China in international field hockey matches and tournaments.

History
The team participated at the 2008 Summer Olympics in Beijing. Most of the players have traditionally been from Inner Mongolia, where the Daur people have been playing Beikou, a game similar to field hockey, for about 1,000 years. The modern game started in China in the mid 1970s. The team has since developed its talent with some overseas Chinese players became eligible to play for the team after 3 years of residence. This is evident in players such as Tim Tsung, who arrived from England 5 years ago and played for the English U16 National team for 3 years (he was signed by the national team and made his debut after a series of successful training sessions and friendly matches).

Tournament history

Summer Olympics
2008 – 11th place

World Cup
2018 – 10th place

Asian Games
1982 – 6th place
1990 – 5th place
1994 – 8th place
1998 – 6th place
2002 – 5th place
2006 – 
2010 – 5th place
2014 – 5th place
 2022 – Qualified

Asia Cup
1982 – 
1985 – 7th place
1989 – 5th place
1994 – 7th place
1999 – 7th place
2003 – 6th place
2007 – 5th place
2009 – 
2017 – 7th place

Asian Champions Trophy
2011 – 6th place
2012 – 4th place
2013 – 4th place
2016 – 5th place

World League
2012–13 – 23rd place
2014–15 – 20th place
2016–17 – 16th place

AHF Cup
 2022 – Withdrew

Sultan Azlan Shah Cup
 2007 – 7th
 2010 – 6th
 2014 – 4th

Current squad
Squad for the 2018 Men's Hockey World Cup.

Head coach: Kim Sang-ryul

See also
China women's national field hockey team

References

External links
Official website
FIH profile

Asian men's national field hockey teams
National team
Men's national sports teams of China